Evgeni Karpoukhine (born 26 September 1973) is a Russian judoka.

Achievements

See also
Sport in Russia

References

External links
 

1973 births
Living people
Russian male judoka
Place of birth missing (living people)
21st-century Russian people